Hypoleucis dacena, the white-fringed recluse, is a species of butterfly in the family Hesperiidae. It is found in Guinea, Sierra Leone, Ivory Coast, Ghana, Nigeria, Cameroon, Bioko, Gabon, the Republic of the Congo, the Central African Republic, the Democratic Republic of the Congo, southern Sudan, Uganda and north-western Tanzania. The habitat consists of forests.

Adults are attracted to the flowers of Costus species.

The larvae feed on Costus afer.

References

Butterflies described in 1876
Hesperiinae
Butterflies of Africa
Taxa named by William Chapman Hewitson